Sergey Gorovoy (born 1975) is a Kazakhstani water polo player from Shymkent. At the 2012 Summer Olympics, he competed for the Kazakhstan men's national water polo team in the men's event. He is 6 ft 4 inches tall.

References

Kazakhstani male water polo players
1975 births
Living people
Olympic water polo players of Kazakhstan
Water polo players at the 2004 Summer Olympics
Water polo players at the 2012 Summer Olympics
People from Shymkent
Asian Games medalists in water polo
Water polo players at the 2002 Asian Games
Water polo players at the 2006 Asian Games
Asian Games gold medalists for Kazakhstan
Asian Games bronze medalists for Kazakhstan

Medalists at the 2002 Asian Games
Medalists at the 2006 Asian Games
20th-century Kazakhstani people
21st-century Kazakhstani people